Jalan Merlimau–Jasin, (Malacca state route M25) is a major road in Malacca state, Malaysia. It is also a main route to the North–South Expressway Southern Route via the Jasin Interchange.

Route background
The Kilometre Zero of Jalan Merlimau–Jasin starts at Merlimau, at its interchange with the Federal Route 5, the main trunk road of the west coast of Peninsular Malaysia.

Features
 Kempas Devon Estate

Most sections of Federal Route M25 were built to the JKR R5 road standard, allowing a maximum speed limit of up to 90 km/h.

Alternate routes
 Kempas Devon bypass
 Jasin–NSE Highway, a dual carriageway highway to North–South Expressway Southern Route via Jasin Interchange.

Sections with motorcycle lanes
None

List of junctions

Roads in Malacca

References